Hinduism is a minority faith in Mizoram followed by 2.75% of its population. There are 30,136 Hindus in Mizoram. There are 12 temples in Mizoram and are managed by the Central Gorkha Mandir Sanchalan Samiti.

History
The ancestors of the current Hindus of Mizoram were Gorkha soldiers and Bengali clerks who settled in the state during the British rule. The Gorkhas arrived in Mizoram in 1871 to liberate the Mary Winchester, daughter of a British tea planter who was abducted by a Mizo tribal chieftain. After liberating her, the British allotted plots for them in the State and many chose to reside there.

Culture
Mizoram is a Christian dominated state and Hindus have coexisted with Christians peacefully for many decades. Hindus and Christians well wishes to each other and   take part in each other's festivities. There have never been a single instance of conflict between the two religions in the State. Many of the Hindus are also part of the Young Mizo Association.

Some Christian influences can be seen in the practices of  Hindu of Mizoram. There are temples in Mizoram which conduct  Sunday service for Hindu deities similar to the Sunday services in Church. In the 'Sunday service’, the Hindu priests deliver sermons and chanting prayers from a standardised ‘book of psalms’ which is similar to Christian book of psalms but is made from Hindu scriptures and includes bhajans and shlokas. The teachers or elders of the Hindu community will then conduct theology classes for Hindu children on Ramayana and Mahabharata .  The Dholak is also played with bhajan during the Sunday sangat (gathering). During the death ceremonies, the deceased body is carried in coffins like Christians and community members gather to sing bhajans before the final rites.

Demographics
According to the 2001 Census, there were 31,562 Hindus in Mizoram  constituting 3.5% of the state's population. It decreased to 30,136 Hindus or 2.75% of the state's population in the 2011 census.
Most of the Hindus in Mizoram are Gorkhas.

District wise Hindu Population

See also
 Hinduism in Nagaland
 Hinduism in Manipur

References

Mizoram